Borax Lake may refer to:

Borax Lake (Oregon), a lake fed by geothermal springs
Borax Lake Site, a lake and archaeological site in Lake County, California
Borax Lake (San Bernardino County, California), a dry lake in San Bernardino County, California now known as Searles Lake